Metzneria artificella is a moth of the family Gelechiidae. It is found from southern and eastern Europe to the southern Ural and the Volga region. It is also found in Iran and southern
Siberia.

References

Moths described in 1861
Metzneria
Moths of Europe